The 1963–64 NCAA University Division men's basketball season began in December 1963, progressed through the regular season and conference tournaments, and concluded with the 1964 NCAA University Division basketball tournament championship game on March 21, 1964, at Municipal Auditorium in Kansas City, Missouri. The UCLA Bruins won their first NCAA national championship with a 98–83 victory over the Duke Blue Devils.

Season headlines 

 The Big Sky Conference began play, with six members.

Season outlook

Pre-season polls 

The Top 10 from the AP Poll and the Top 20 from the UPI Coaches Poll during the pre-season.

Conference membership changes

Regular season

Conference winners and tournaments

Informal championships

Statistical leaders

Post-season tournaments

NCAA tournament

Final Four 

 Third Place – Michigan 100, Kansas State 90

National Invitation tournament

Semifinals & finals 

 Third Place – Army 60, NYU 59

Awards

Consensus All-American teams

Major player of the year awards 

 Helms Player of the Year: Walt Hazzard, UCLA
 Associated Press Player of the Year: Gary Bradds, Ohio State
 UPI Player of the Year: Gary Bradds, Ohio State
 Oscar Robertson Trophy (USBWA): Walt Hazzard, UCLA
 Sporting News Player of the Year: Bill Bradley, Princeton

Major coach of the year awards 

 Henry Iba Award: John Wooden, UCLA
 NABC Coach of the Year: John Wooden, UCLA
 UPI Coach of the Year: John Wooden, UCLA
 Sporting News Coach of the Year: John Wooden, UCLA

Other major awards 

 Robert V. Geasey Trophy (Top player in Philadelphia Big 5): Steve Courtin, Saint Joseph's, & Wali Jones, Villanova
 NIT/Haggerty Award (Top player in New York City metro area): Nick Werkman, Seton Hall

Coaching changes 

A number of teams changed coaches during the season and after it ended.

References